Love Letters is a play by A. R. Gurney that was a finalist for the Pulitzer Prize for Drama. The play centers on two characters, Melissa Gardner and Andrew Makepeace Ladd III. Using the epistolary form sometimes found in novels, they sit side by side at tables and read the notes, letters and cards – in which over nearly 50 years, they discuss their hopes and ambitions, dreams and disappointments, victories and defeats – that have passed between them throughout their separated lives.

The play is a performance favorite for busy name actors, for it requires little preparation, and lines need not be memorized. It was first performed by the playwright himself with Holland Taylor at the New York Public Library, then opened in 1988 at the Long Wharf Theatre in New Haven, Connecticut, with Joanna Gleason and John Rubinstein.

Plot 

Andrew Makepeace Ladd III and Melissa Gardner, both born to wealth and position, are childhood friends whose lifelong correspondence begins with birthday party thank-you notes and summer camp postcards. Romantically attached, they continue to exchange letters through the boarding school and college years—where Andy goes on to excel at Yale and law school, while Melissa flunks out of a series of "good schools". While Andy is off at war Melissa marries, but her attachment to Andy remains strong and she continues to keep in touch as he marries, becomes a successful attorney, gets involved in politics and, eventually, is elected to the U.S. Senate. Meanwhile, her marriage in tatters, Melissa dabbles in art and gigolos, drinks more than she should, and becomes estranged from her children. Eventually she and Andy do become involved in a brief affair, but it is really too late for both of them. However Andy's last letter, written to her mother after Melissa's untimely death, makes it eloquently clear how much they really meant, and gave to, each other over the years—physically apart, perhaps, but spiritually as close as only true lovers can be.

Broadway and Off-Broadway productions 

Directed by John Tillinger, it opened with Kathleen Turner and John Rubinstein on March 27, 1989, at the off-Broadway Promenade Theatre, where it ran for 64 performances. The play was performed only on Sunday and Monday evenings and changed its cast weekly. Among those who appeared in it were Barbara Barrie, Philip Bosco, Bruce Davison, Victor Garber, Julie Harris, George Grizzard, Anthony Heald, George Hearn, Richard Kiley, Dana Ivey, William Hurt, Marsha Mason, Christopher Reeve, Holland Taylor, George Segal, Christopher Walken, Joan Van Ark, Treat Williams, Frances Sternhagen, Hank Offinger, Rebecca Cole, Meredith Baxter, Michael Gross and Nancy Blaine.

On October 31 that same year, a Broadway production opened at the Edison Theatre, where it ran for 96 performances. It opened with Colleen Dewhurst and Jason Robards. Other performers paired in the Broadway production included Lynn Redgrave and John Clark, Stockard Channing and John Rubinstein, Jane Curtin and Edward Herrmann, Kate Nelligan and David Dukes, Polly Bergen and Robert Vaughn, Timothy Hutton and Elizabeth McGovern, Swoosie Kurtz and Richard Thomas, Elaine Stritch and Cliff Robertson, Nancy Marchand and Fritz Weaver, and Robert Foxworth and Elizabeth Montgomery.

Other productions 

In 1990, the play had lengthy seasons on the West Coast, at the Canon Theater in Beverly Hills, and the Theater on the Square in San Francisco, with many name actors from the movie industry.  It also adapts very well for performance on cruise ships.

In the early 1990s, Larry Hagman reunited with his Dallas co-star Linda Gray for a tour with Love Letters. Later, in 2006, Hagman performed in the play five times in New York and Florida with his I Dream of Jeannie co-star Barbara Eden.

Shortly before his death in 1992, Robert Reed appeared in the touring production of Love Letters, opposite Betsy Palmer.

On Valentine's Day 1992, Charlton Heston and his wife Lydia Clarke performed the play at the Hershey Theater in Hershey, Pennsylvania.

In the mid-1990s, the play toured with Robert Wagner and Jill St. John. However, before performing with his wife, Jill St. John, Wagner acted with his Hart to Hart co-star Stefanie Powers beginning in Boston in 1988. Together they did more than 350 performances and were the first to bring the play to the Wyndham's Theatre in London's West End.

On July 17, 1993, Carol Burnett, Brian Dennehy, Mel Gibson, and Sissy Spacek performed the play at the Sheridan Opera House in Telluride, Colorado.

In the spring of 1993 a series of actors appeared in the play at the New Mexico Repertory Theater in Santa Fe and Albuquerque, New Mexico.  They included Carol Burnett and Charlton Heston, Brooke Shields and her Endless Love co-star Martin Hewitt, Karen Grassle and Michael Gross, and real-life husband and wife team Jean Smart and Richard Gilliland.

In 1993, Fred Grandy and his wife Catherine Mann toured across Iowa performing the play for charity, especially children's charities.

In 1994, Liza Minnelli and Desi Arnaz Jr. appeared in a benefit performance of the play in Miami.

In early 1995, Lynn Redgrave and John Clark, at the invitation of Judge Lance Ito, performed the play for the sequestered jury on their day off, in the same courtroom where the O. J. Simpson trial was being held.

In 1996, Alan Young and Connie Hines, who played married horse-owners on the 1961-66 TV show Mister Ed, performed the play in Irvine, California.

On June 4, 2007, Sigourney Weaver and Jeff Daniels performed Love Letters at New York University as a benefit for the Flea Theatre. Directed by Weaver's husband, Jim Simpson and attended by the playwright, this performance was repeated on July 26, 2008, at the Detroit Institute of Art's Detroit Film Theater in a benefit for Daniels' Purple Rose Theatre Company.

Bernadette Peters and John Dossett performed a one-night-only reading of Love Letters on September 24, 2007, at New World Stages to benefit Opening Act.

In October 2007, Claire Bloom appeared opposite Peter Bowles in a production at the Théâtre Princesse Grace, Monte Carlo, directed by Marc Sinden, as part of his British Theatre Season, in Monaco.

On December 1, 2007, Elizabeth Taylor and James Earl Jones gave a benefit performance of the play, directed by John Tillinger, to raise one million dollars for Taylor's AIDS foundation. Tickets for the show were priced at $2,500 and more than 500 people attended. The event happened to coincide with the 2007 Writers Guild of America strike and, rather than cross the picket line, Taylor requested a "one night dispensation". The Writers Guild agreed not to picket the Paramount Pictures lot that night, to allow for the performance.

In January 2010, CBC Television aired an adaptation which included Canadians Samantha Bee and Jason Jones of the American cable comedy show The Daily Show.

On July 31, 2010, Primetime Emmy Award-winning husband and wife actors Michael Emerson and Carrie Preston read the play at the Charleston Stage. They performed it as a fundraiser for the South Carolina's theatre.

From July 29 to August 1, 2010, Tony Dow (Wally from Leave it to Beaver) and Janice Kent (Mary Ellen Cleaver on The New Leave it to Beaver) performed Love Letters at the Repertory East Playhouse in Newhall, California. It was directed by Mark Kaplan.

On October 9, 2010, Meredith Baxter and Michael Gross performed the play in Lakireddy Auditorium at the University of California, Merced as a fundraiser for the University Arts Program. They performed the show again in August 2017 at Totem Pole Playhouse in Pennsylvania.

In October 2011 the play was set on the stage of Pushkin Theatre in Moscow (Russia). The roles were played by actor and film director Vladimir Menshov and his wife Vera Alentova. Both participated in creation of the famous movie Moscow Does Not Believe in Tears which won an Academy Award for Best Foreign Language Film in 1980.

From January 19–22, 2012, Tab Hunter and Joyce DeWitt performed the play at Judson Theatre Company in Pinehurst, North Carolina, directed by Daniel Haley. They performed it again in October 2012 at Arrow Rock Lyceum Theatre and in January 2013 at Sedona International Film Festival.

From June 18–23, 2012, Jerry Hall and David Soul, directed by Michael Scott, performed at the Gaiety Theatre, Dublin. 
 
On June 24, 2012, Larry Storch and Marie Wallace presented a benefit performance at The Actor's Temple in New York City.

From May 7–11, 2013, Glynis Barber and Michael Brandon performed the play at Dundee Repertory Theatre, Scotland, directed by Ian Talbot.

On June 29, 2013 Katharine Ross and her husband Sam Elliott performed the play as a benefit for the Malibu Playhouse at the Edye Second Space, the Broad Stage, Santa Monica, directed by Diane Namm.

On October 26, 2013, Barbara Eden and Hal Linden performed the play for one-night only at Poway Center for the Performing Arts in Poway, California.

On November 16, 2013, Governor Jack Markell, of Delaware, and his wife Carla Smathers Markell, performed the play at a fund raiser for the Delaware Theater Company, in Wilmington, Delaware.

The play returned to Broadway on September 13, 2014, to the Brooks Atkinson Theater in limited engagements with rotating casts. The first cast starred Brian Dennehy and Mia Farrow, followed by Carol Burnett with Dennehy, and Alan Alda and Candice Bergen; scheduled next were Anjelica Huston, Stacy Keach, Diana Rigg and Martin Sheen. This production closed early, after 6 previews and 95 performances, ending with the cast of Alan Alda and Candice Bergen on December 14, 2014.
 
Since 2014, J. Cast Productions has produced several versions of the show, featuring Lorenzo Lamas and Charlene Tilton, Shirley Jones and husband Marty Ingels, and Patrick Duffy and Linda Gray among others.

A national tour got underway in 2015 starring Ali MacGraw and Ryan O'Neal. The two starred together in the movie Love Story.

In October 2015, Canadian actors Sheila McCarthy and David Ferry appeared in a sold-out run of Love Letters in Hamilton, Ontario, directed by Darren Stewart-Jones.

In February 2016, the play was translated into Chinese and series of performance were carried out in Macao, China.

On October 8–9, 2016, Tony Dow (Wally from Leave it to Beaver) performed once again in Love Letters - this time with co-star Beverly Washburn (star of many TV shows and films including Old Yeller) to sold-out performances. Beverly and Tony had actually dated in the 1950s and, like the characters in the play, had a history and friendship that has survived the many years. The play was directed by Adam Reeves and produced by R&R Stage and Screen at the Rheem Theatre in Moraga, CA.

On November 10, 2016, Rita Wilson and Tom Hanks performed "Love Letters" at Stanford University for a fundraiser for the arts.

On February 24, 2017, the play was performed at Cebu City, Philippines, by the Cre8tive Thespians of Cebu, Inc., to celebrate the 12th anniversary of their community theatre. The cast included Warren Tompong, Mary Immaculate Aringay, Agatha Enecio, and Sonny Alquizola, who also directed the production.

On June 2, 2018, Dan Lauria and Wendie Malick performed the play at Souhegan High School in Amherst, New Hampshire for a fundraiser for the Front Door Agency, a transitional housing non-profit.

On February 22 and 23, 2019, Rensen Chan and Jo Ngai of Hong Kong's The Nonsensemakers (and a husband and wife duo), performed a Cantonese adaptation of the play at the annual Huayi Chinese Festival of Arts at Singapore's Esplanade - Theatres on the Bay.

On February 23 and 24, 2019, Nelson Chia and Mia Chee, co-founders of Singapore's Nine Years Theatre (and a husband and wife duo), performed a Mandarin adaptation of the play at the annual Huayi Chinese Festival of Arts at Singapore's Esplanade – Theatres on the Bay.

In May, 2020, Sally Field and Bryan Cranston performed an online version of the play during the COVID-19 pandemic to benefit the Actors Fund.

In December, 2020, Martin Shaw and Jenny Seagrove performed at Theatre Royal Haymarket before being forced to close the production early due to the COVID-19 pandemic.

The production, produced by Bill Kenwright, was announced as returning to the West End in May 2021.

Another British revival (also produced by Kenwright) took place on 6 and 7 June 2022 at the Theatre Royal, Windsor with Patrick Duffy and Linda Purl.

Adaptations
In 1992, the play was adapted to Urdu and an Indian context by playwright Javed Siddiqui, as Tumhari Amrita and performed by veteran Indian actors Shabana Azmi and Farooq Sheikh, under the direction of Feroz Abbas Khan. It later toured to many parts of the world, including the US, Europe, and Pakistan.

In 1993, episode 518 of Mystery Science Theater 3000 satirized the play, condensing it to about a minute with dialog such as "Dear Melissa, I turned middle-aged this week. I'm a rich WASP and I love you."

In 1999, Gurney adapted Love Letters for a television film, directed by Stanley Donen, that dramatized scenes and portrayed characters merely described in the play. Laura Linney and Steven Weber starred.

On November 13, 2017, a Russian performance of the play was held in Moscow (the stage of the Malaya Bronnaya Theater) by the Atelier Theater, directed by Dainius Kazlauskas and starring Ekaterina Klimova and Gosha Kutsenko.

References

 Love Letters and Two Other Plays: The Golden Age, What I Did Last Summer (Plume Drama) 
 Love Letters (Dramatists Play Service – acting edition)

External links
 
 
 
 Love Letters at the A. R. Gurney website

1988 plays
Broadway plays
Plays by A. R. Gurney
American plays adapted into films
Two-handers